Mount Pleasant Airport  was a city-owned, public use airport located two nautical miles (4 km) southwest of the central business district of Mount Pleasant, a city in Sanpete County, Utah, United States. The airport closed in January 2016.

Facilities and aircraft 
Mount Pleasant Airport covered an area of 361 acres (146 ha) at an elevation of 5,830 feet (1,777 m) above mean sea level. It had one runway designated 2/20 with an asphalt surface measuring 4,242 by 60 feet (1,293 x 18 m).

For the 12-month period ending December 31, 2009, the airport had 2,410 aircraft operations, an average of 200 per month: 99% general aviation and 1% air taxi. At that time there were five single-engine aircraft based at this airport.

References

External links 
 Aerial image as of October 1997 from USGS The National Map
 

Defunct airports in the United States
Airports in Utah
Transportation in Sanpete County, Utah